Vujović (Montenegrin and Serbian Cyrillic: Вујовић) is a Montenegrin (from Cetinje), Croatian (from Štikovo, variant of Vujević) and Serbian surname. Notable people with the surname include:

Goran Vujović  (born 1987), Montenegrin footballer
Marija Vujović (born 1984), Montenegrin supermodel
Nikola Vujović (footballer, born 1981), Montenegrin footballer
Nikola Vujović (footballer, born 1990), Serbian footballer
Oliver Vujović (born 1969), Yugoslav, German, and Austrian former journalist and SEEMO General Secretary
Ratko Vujović (1916–1977), Montenegrin political activist and soldier
Vladimir Vujović (1922–1988), the birth name of French actor Michel Auclair
Vojislav Vujović (1897–1936), prominent Yugoslav Communist and secretary of the Communist Youth International
Vladimir Vujović (footballer) (born 1982), Montenegrin footballer
Zoran Vujović (born 1958), Croatian footballer
Zlatko Vujović (born 1958), Croatian footballer, twin brother of Zoran

See also
Nicolás Vuyovich, Argentinian

References 

Serbian surnames
Montenegrin surnames
Croatian surnames